A leadership election was held in the Civic Democratic Party (ODS) in the Czech Republic on 4 December 2004. The incumbent  leader Mirek Topolánek ran unopposed and his victory was expected. Topolánek received votes from 354 of the 391 party delegates.

Results

References

2004
Civic Democratic Party leadership election
Single-candidate elections
Indirect elections
Elections in Prague
Civic Democratic Party leadership election
Civic Democratic Party leadership election